The Usumacinta sea catfish (Potamarius usumacintae) is a species of catfish in the family Ariidae. It was described by Ricardo Betancur-Rodriguez and Philip W. Willink in 2007. It is endemic to the Usumacinta River between Mexico and Guatemala.

The species epithet "usumacintae" refers to the Usumacinta River.

References

Ariidae
Fish described in 2007